The Bienne–Evilard Funicular (German:Leubringenbahn; French:Funiculaire Bienne–Evilard) is a funicular railway in the bilingual city of Biel/Bienne in the Swiss canton of Bern. The funicular links Biel/Bienne with Leubringen/Evilard in the Jura mountains above the town.

The line is operated by Verkehrsbetriebe Biel/Transports publics biennois (short: VB/TPB) since 2014.

Operation 
The line has the following parameters:

See also 
 List of funicular railways
 List of funiculars in Switzerland

References

External links 

Official web site of the FUNIC company (in German and French)

Funicular railways in Switzerland
Public transport in Switzerland
Transport in Biel/Bienne